John Ashton Floyd was a sculptor based in Manchester, England, in the inter-war years of the 20th century, who created a number of notable works.

Works
John Floyd's work includes sculptures in the Grade II* listed 100 King Street building in Manchester, commissioned by Edwin Lutyens. He created the sculpted wounded soldier and the figure of Peace who is taking the sword of honour from his hand, between 1919 and 1922 for the main Ashton-under-Lyne War Memorial. He was also responsible for the 1921 Royton War Memorial on Tandle Hill near Oldham.

He was for a time an assistant to John Cassidy, an Irish sculptor and painter who settled in Manchester. Floyd created a sculpture forming the Manchester Post Office peace memorial – unveiled in 1929 – in Cassidy's Plymouth Grove studio.

References

English sculptors
English male sculptors